Gary Patterson  (born 1960) is an American football coach and former player. 

Gary Patterson may also refer to:
Gary Patterson (footballer) (born 1972), English footballer
Gary Patterson (artist) (born 1941), American artist
Gary Paterson (born 1949), American Christian leader